Richard Haines (born Marion, Iowa, December 29, 1906, died, Los Angeles, California October 9, 1984) was an American New Deal muralist.

Murals 

Murals were produced from 1934 to 1943 in the United States through the Section of Painting and Sculpture, later called the Section of Fine Arts, of the Treasury Department. Haines was commissioned to paint an oil-on-canvas mural for the Berwyn, Illinois post office In 1942, and the Hastings, Minnesota post office. Arrival of the Fall Catalogue was completed in 1938. He also painted a fresco mural in the Sebeka, Minnesota High School building in 1938.

Death
Richard Haines died in 1984 in Los Angeles, California.

References

1906 births
1984 deaths
People from Iowa
American muralists
Section of Painting and Sculpture artists